Bill Summers (born June 27, 1948) is a New Orleans based Afro-Cuban jazz/Latin jazz percussionist, a multi-instrumentalist who plays primarily on conga drums.

Career
In the 70's, he founded Bill Summers & Summers Heat together with Bo Freeman, Calvin Tillery, Carla Vaughn, Claytoven Richardson, Earl Freeman, Freddie Washington, George Spencer, Hadley Caliman, James Levi, Jeff Lewis, Larry Batiste, Leo Miller, Lori Ham, Michael Sasaki, Munyungo Jackson, Paul Van Wageningen, Ray Obiedo, Rodney Franklin, Scott Roberts and Tom Poole.
The group produced 7 albums between 1977 and 1983 :

 Cayenne 
 Straight to the bank 
 On Sunshine 
 Jam the box 
 Call it what you want 
 Seventeen 
 London Style 

During the 1990s, Summers played with Los Hombres Calientes along with co-leader of the group, trumpeter Irvin Mayfield and Jason Marsalis. However, Summers has a much longer musical career, often working behind the scenes on film scores for various movies such as The Color Purple and the television miniseries Roots with Quincy Jones. He also played with Herbie Hancock during The Headhunters years, and is mentioned in passing by the liner notes of The Headhunters' 2003 release Evolution Revolution as contributing to that recording.  His former wife is Yvette Bostic-Summers, who often sings on Los Hombres' albums.

Discography

As leader
 Feel the Heat (Prestige, 1977)
 Cayenne (Prestige, 1977)
 Straight to the Bank (Prestige, 1978)
 On Sunshine (Prestige, 1979)
 Call it What You Want (MCA, 1981) U.S. No. 129
 Jam the Box (MCA, 1981) U.S. No. 92
 Seventeen (MCA, 1982)
 London Style (MCA, 1983)
 Iroko (Vital, 1992)
 The Essence of Kwanzaa (Monkey Hill, 1997)
 Studies in Bata: Sacred Drum of the Yoruba, Havana to Matanzas (Bilsum, 2002)

With Los Hombres Calientes
 Los Hombres Calientes (Basin Street, 1998)
 Vol. 2 (Basin Street, 2000)
 Vol. 3 New Congo Square (Basin Street, 2001)
 Vol. 4: Vodou Dance (Basin Street, 2003)

As sideman
With Terry Garthwaite
 Terry (Arista Records, 1975)

With Johnny Hammond
 Forever Taurus (Milestone, 1976)
 Storm Warning (Milestone, 1977)
 Don't Let the System Get You (Milestone, 1978)

With Herbie Hancock
 Head Hunters (Columbia, 1973)
 Thrust (Columbia, 1974)
 Man-Child (Columbia, 1975)
 Flood (Columbia, 1975)
 Sunlight (Columbia, 1978)
 Directstep (Columbia, 1979)
 Feets, Don't Fail Me Now (Columbia, 1979)
 Mr. Hands (Columbia, 1980)
 Autodrive (Columbia, 1983)
 Dis Is Da Drum (Mercury, 1994)
 Omaha Civic Auditorium, 17th November 1975 (Hi Hat, 2015)

With The Headhunters
 Survival of the Fittest (Arista, 1975)
 Straight from the Gate (Arista, 1977)
 Return of the Headhunters (Verve Forecast, 1998)
 Evolution Revolution (Basin Street, 2003)
 On Top: Live in Europe (BHM, 2008)
 Platinum (Owl Studios, 2011)

With Eddie Henderson
 Inside Out (Capricorn, 1974)
 Mahal (Capitol, 1978)
 Runnin' to Your Love (Capitol, 1979)

With Quincy Jones
 Roots (A&M, 1977)
 The Color Purple (Qwest, 1986)
 Back On the Block (Qwest, 1989)

With David "Fathead" Newman
 Concrete Jungle (Prestige, 1978)
 Keep the Dream Alive (Prestige, 1978)
 Scratch My Back (Prestige, 1979)

With Sonny Rollins
 The Way I Feel (Milestone, 1976)
 Easy Living (Milestone, 1978)
 Don't Ask (Milestone, 1979)
 Love at First Sight (Milestone, 1980)
 Silver City (Milestone, 1996)

With Patrice Rushen
 Shout It Out (Prestige, 1977)
 Patrice (Elektra, 1978)
 Pizzazz (Elektra, 1979)

With Vinx
 Rooms in My Fatha's House (PANGAEA, 1991)
 I Love My Job (PANGAEA, 1992)
 The Storyteller (PANGAEA, 1993)
 Lips' Stretched Out (H.O.E. Heroes of Expression, 1996)
 The Mood I'm In (Peermusic, 2002)

With others
 Bar-Kays, Money Talks (Stax, 1978)
 Gato Barbieri, Tropico (A&M, 1978)
 Gato Barbieri, Passion and Fire (A&M, 1984)
 Gary Bartz, Music Is My Sanctuary (Capitol, 1977)
 Gary Bartz, Love Affair (Capitol, 1978)
 John Beasley, Cauldron (Windham Hill, 1992)
 John Beasley, A Change of Heart (Windham Hill, 1993)
 George Benson, Love Remembers (Warner Bros., 1993)
 Carmen Bradford, With Respect (Evidence, 1995)
 Brass Fever, Time Is Running Out (Impulse!, 1976)
 Dee Dee Bridgewater, Dee Dee's Feathers (Okeh, 2015)
 Cachao, Master Sessions Volume I (Epic, 1994)
 Jim Clayton, Songs My Daughter Knows (Clay-Tone, 2013)
 Jon Cleary, Moonburn (Pointblank, 1999)
 Con Funk Shun, Candy (Mercury, 1979)
 Harry Connick Jr., Every Man Should Know (Columbia, 2013)
 Harry Connick Jr., Smokey Mary (Columbia, 2013)
 Norman Connors, Love from the Sun (Buddah, 1973)
 Norman Connors, Saturday Night Special (Buddah, 1975)
 Michael Des Barres, Somebody Up There Likes Me (Gold Mountain, 1986)
 Djavan, Bird of Paradise (Columbia, 1988)
 Lamont Dozier, Peddlin' Music On the Side (Warner Bros., 1977)
 Pete Escovedo & Sheila Escovedo, Solo Two (Fantasy, 1977)
 Eddy Grant, Love in Exile (ICE, 1980)
 Nigel Hall, Ladies & Gentlemen... Nigel Hall (Round Hill, 2015)
 Joe Henderson, Black Miracle (Milestone, 1976)
 Joe Henderson, Black Narcissus (Milestone, 1976)
 George Howard, Attitude Adjustment (GRP, 1996)
 Bobbi Humphrey, Tailor Made (Epic, 1977)
 Bobby Hutcherson, Conception: the Gift of Love (Columbia, 1979)
 Phyllis Hyman, Somewhere in My Lifetime (Arista, 1978)
 Ahmad Jamal, One (20th Century Fox, 1978)
 Kimiko Kasai, Round and Round (CBS, 1978)
 Kimiko Kasai, Butterfly (CBS, 1979)
 Salif Keita, Amen (Island, 1991)
 Babatunde Lea, March of the Jazz Guerrillas (Ubiquity, 2000)
 Kenny Loggins, Leap of Faith (Columbia, 1991)
 Kenny Loggins, The Unimaginable Life (Columbia, 1997)
 Jon Lucien, Listen Love (Mercury, 1991)
 Bobby Lyle, The Journey (Atlantic, 1990)
 Taj Mahal, Like Never Before (Private Music, 1991)
 Wade Marcus, Metamorphosis (ABC Impulse!, 1976)
 Harvey Mason, Chameleon (Concord, 2014)
 Bennie Maupin, The Jewel in the Lotus (ECM, 1974)
 Country Joe McDonald, Goodbye Blues (Fantasy, 1977)
 Idris Muhammad, You Ain't No Friend of Mine! (Fantasy, 1978)
 Maria Muldaur, Fanning the Flames (Telarc, 1996)
 Meshell Ndegeocello, Plantation Lullabies (Sire, 1993)
 Shawn Phillips, Rumplestiltskin's Resolve (A&M, 1976)
 Shawn Phillips, Spaced (A&M, 1977)
 The Pointer Sisters, That's a Plenty (Blue Thumb, 1974)
 The Pointer Sisters, Steppin' ABC (Blue Thumb, 1975)
 Dianne Reeves, Never Too Far (Emi, 1989)
 Dianne Reeves, I Remember (Blue Note, 1991)
 Merl Saunders, Fire Up (Fantasy, 1973)
 Seawind, Window of a Child (CTI, 1977)
 Wayne Shorter, Phantom Navigator (Columbia, 1987)
 Nina Simone, A Single Woman (Elektra, 1993)
 Sting, The Soul Cages (A&M, 1990)
 Kevin Toney, Special K (Fantasy, 1982)
 Allen Toussaint, Connected (NYNO, 1996)
 Stanley Turrentine, Everybody Come On Out (Fantasy, 1976)
 McCoy Tyner, Together (Milestone, 1979)
 The Wailing Souls, All Over the World (Columbia, 1992)
 Lenny Williams, Rise Sleeping Beauty (Motown, 1975)
 Bobby Womack, Safety Zone (United Artists, 1975)
 Stevie Wonder, Conversation Peace (Motown, 1995)
 Zawinul Syndicate, Lost Tribes'' (Columbia, 1992)

Singles

References

1948 births
Living people
Afro-Cuban jazz percussionists
Jazz fusion percussionists
Jazz-funk percussionists
Latin jazz percussionists
Los Hombres Calientes members
The Headhunters members
MCA Records artists